Celebrity Big Brother 21, also known as Celebrity Big Brother: Year of the Woman, was the twenty-first series of the British reality television series Celebrity Big Brother. It launched on 2 January 2018 on Channel 5, and concluded on 2 February 2018 after 32 days, making it the joint longest series to date. It is the fourteenth celebrity series and the twenty-first series of Big Brother overall to air on Channel 5. Emma Willis returned to host the series, while Rylan Clark-Neal continued to present Celebrity Big Brother's Bit on the Side.

On 2 February 2018, Courtney Act was announced as the winner of the series having received 49.43% of the final vote, with Ann Widdecombe as the runner-up after receiving 39.50%.

Production
It was confirmed on ITV's This Morning that for the first time in Celebrity Big Brother history the launch show will be made up of all females, to mark 100 years of women's suffrage. It was later confirmed that male housemates will enter the house on 5 January.

Eye logo
The official logo was released on 5 December 2017 and was based on a human eye, the first since Celebrity Big Brother 7 in 2010. Designers also ditched the template used in all previous Channel 5 series.

Teasers
On 14 December 2017, eight 3-second teasers were released featuring human eyes believed to be the eyes of the new housemates. The official trailer was released on 25 December 2017, the trailer featured eyes believed to be of the celebrity housemates, with Emma Willis featured at the end.

House
The official house pictures were released on 18 December 2017. The house has a contemporary look with a copper and bronze finishes. A new feature for the series includes a sauna added to a new room in the garden. The two bedrooms were kept, each being named after famous women suffrage campaigners. They were called the 'Davison Bedroom', after Emily Davison, and the 'Pankhurst Bedroom', after  Emmeline, Sylvia and Christabel.

Housemates
On Day 1, eight female housemates entered the house during the launch. It was also confirmed that a further eight males would be joining them on Day 4 during a live special.

Amanda Barrie
Amanda Barrie is an English actress who is best known for playing Alma Halliwell in ITV soap opera Coronation Street. In 1963 and 1964, Barrie starred in two Carry On films, Carry On Cabby and Carry On Cleo. Most recently, she appeared in the TV series The Real Marigold Hotel. She entered the house on Day 1 and was the eleventh housemate to be evicted, on Day 29.

Andrew Brady
Andrew Brady is a British reality television personality best known for competing on the thirteenth series of The Apprentice in 2017. He entered the house on Day 4 and was the sixth housemate to be evicted, on Day 25.

Ann Widdecombe
Ann Widdecombe is a British former Conservative politician and author. Widdecombe became most known for expressing views opposing abortion, voting for the reinstatement of the death penalty and opposing same-sex marriage. Since retiring, she appeared on the eighth series of Strictly Come Dancing and most recently, starred in pantomime. She entered the house on Day 1 and left the house on Day 32, as the runner-up.

Ashley James
Ashley James is a British reality television personality known for starring as a cast member on the E4 reality series Made in Chelsea during the fourth and fifth series. Since then, she began concentrating on her music career as a DJ. She entered the house on Day 1 and was the ninth housemate to be evicted, on Day 29.

Daniel O'Reilly
David Daniel O'Reilly, known better by his stage name Dapper Laughs, is a British stand-up comedian and media personality. In 2014, he hosted his own dating show Dapper Laughs: On the Pull on ITV2, but it was axed after one series following a rape joke controversy. He also reached number 15 in the UK Singles Chart with his debut single "Proper Moist". He entered the house on Day 4 and was the eighth housemate to be evicted, on Day 25.

Ginuwine
Elgin Baylor Lumpkin, known better by his stage name Ginuwine, is an American singer, songwriter and actor best known for releasing a number of multi-platinum and platinum-selling albums and singles in the 1990s and 2000s, including "Pony" in 1996. As well as singing, he has starred in films such as Juwanna Mann and television series such as Martial Law. He entered the house on Day 4 and was the fifth housemate to be evicted, on Day 22.

India Willoughby
India Willoughby is an English journalist and newsreader, best known for becoming Britain's first transgender television newsreader. She began her career on ITV in 2000. She entered the house on Day 1 and was the first housemate to be evicted, on Day 11.

Jess Impiazzi
Jess Impiazzi is a British reality television personality and glamour model, best known as a cast member in the MTV reality series Ex on the Beach during the second series in 2015 before later returning for the fifth "All star" series in 2016. Before this, she appeared on The Only Way Is Essex in 2012 as a "Sugar Hut Honey". She entered the house on Day 1 and left the house on Day 32 in fourth place.

John Barnes
John Barnes is a Jamaican-born British former footballer, rapper and manager. He is best known for his time at Watford and Liverpool, as well as playing for the England national team in the 1980s and 1990s. In the run-up to England's 1990 FIFA World Cup campaign, he recorded a rap for the official team song, New Order's "World in Motion" which reached number one in the UK Singles Chart. After retiring from football, he became a commentator and pundit for ESPN and SuperSport. He entered the house on Day 4, and was the fourth housemate to be evicted, on Day 20.

Jonny Mitchell
Jonny Mitchell is a British business director and reality television personality best known for being a cast member in the third series of ITV2 dating reality show Love Island in 2017. He entered the house on Day 4 and was the seventh housemate to be evicted, on Day 25.

Maggie Oliver
Margaret Oliver is an English former Detective Constable in the Greater Manchester Police, best known for exposing the Rochdale child sex abuse ring. Oliver quit the force after serving 16 years to expose the wrongdoings of senior officers. She entered the house on Day 1 and was the third housemate to be evicted, on Day 18.

Malika Haqq
Malika Haqq is an American reality television personality and actress, best known for her friendship with Khloe Kardashian as well as appearing in her reality shows such as Keeping Up with the Kardashians and Dash Dolls. In 2017, Haqq took part in dating show Famously Single. As an actress she has appeared in films such as Sky High and ATL. She entered the house on Day 1 and was the tenth housemate to be evicted, on Day 29.

Rachel Johnson
Rachel Johnson is a British editor, journalist, television presenter, and author. She is also the sister of Boris Johnson. She entered the house on Day 1 and became the second housemate to be evicted, on Day 18.

Shane Jenek/Courtney Act
Shane Gilberto Jenek, known better by their stage name Courtney Act,  is an Australian drag queen and reality television personality best known for being a finalist in the sixth season of RuPaul's Drag Race. As well as this, Jenek has appeared on Australian Idol and most recently MTV's Single AF in 2017. Shane J entered the house on Day 4 as Courtney. On Day 32, it was announced that they had won the series.

Shane Lynch
Shane Lynch is an Irish singer-songwriter best known as a member of boy band Boyzone. The band had 6 number-one singles in the UK Singles Chart, including "No Matter What". Lynch began an acting career, appearing in Sky One's Dream Team, and has since starred in pantomime. He has also taken part in reality television shows The Games and Love Island. He entered the house on Day 4 and left the house on Day 32 in third place.

Wayne Sleep
Wayne Sleep is a British dancer, choreographer and actor. He has also taken part in Celebrity MasterChef, the second series of I'm a Celebrity...Get Me Out of Here!, and was a judge on ITV talent show Stepping Out. As an actor, Sleep has had roles in films such as The First Great Train Robbery and Elizabeth. He entered the house on Day 4 and left the house on Day 32 in fifth place.

Summary

Nominations table

Notes

 : Over the course of the first week, the housemates were given several opportunities to win immunity from the first round of nominations. On launch night, Amanda and Jess won immunity. Later that night, they awarded Maggie immunity. On Day 2, Malika won immunity. After the men entered, they were given the opportunity to win one more immunity pass. On Day 5, Shane J won immunity. As a further twist, the nominations were face-to-face, and only the female housemates could nominate.
 : As the men won this week's task, only they were eligible to nominate. Ashley also won immunity during a task, meaning she could not be nominated. After winning the Big Brother's Driving School task, Ann and Daniel were given the opportunity to save a housemate from eviction and replace them with another housemate. They chose to save Daniel, and replaced him with Maggie.
 : The women and men separately were asked to discuss and nominate two housemates of the opposite gender to face eviction. The men nominated Amanda and Ann, while the women nominated Daniel and John. After the women and men competed in a series of tasks, the women were declared the winners and were granted the right to evict one of the two nominated men. They decided to evict John.
 : As the women won this week's task, only they were eligible to nominate in a face-to-face nomination.
 : The public were voting to win rather than to save. Shane J/Courtney won with 49.43% of the final vote, whilst Ann was runner-up with 39.50%. Shane L was third with 7.42%, Jess was fourth with 2.75%, and Wayne finished fifth with 0.90%, however none of these figures take into account the vote freezes between each position.

Ratings
Official ratings are taken from BARB. Ratings for the episodes on 13 and 20 January (Saturday on Week 3 and 4) include the first-look episode, which aired earlier in the evening on 5Star.

References

External links
Official website 

2018 British television seasons
21